National Hockey Stadium is a purpose-built field hockey stadium in Lahore, Pakistan. Located inside the Nishtar Park Sports Complex, it is the biggest terrace field hockey stadium in the world, having a capacity of 45,000 spectators.

The offices of Sports Board Punjab and Pakistan Hockey Federation are also located in the stadium compound.

Tournaments hosted 
It hosted all matches of the 1990 Men's Hockey World Cup, where the hosts were defeated 3–1 by the Netherlands in the final. It has hosted many international matches and competitions, including the inaugural edition of the Champions Trophy tournament in 1978, and further editions in 1988, 1994, 1998 and 2004. 

In January 2018, it hosted a two-match series between World XI and Pakistan, also hosted Haier Hockey Series Open in December 2018.

Political events hosted 
Chairman Pakistan Tehreek-e-Insaf, former prime minister of Pakistan Imran Khan announced the its power show, Haqeeqi Azadi jalsa, would be held at National Hockey Stadium on August 13, 2022.

See also
 List of stadiums by capacity
 List of stadiums in Pakistan
 List of cricket grounds in Pakistan
 List of hockey stadiums in Pakistan
 List of sports venues in Karachi
 List of sports venues in Lahore
 List of sports venues in Faisalabad

References

Field hockey venues in Pakistan
Lahore
Libya–Pakistan relations

Sports venues in Lahore
Stadiums in Pakistan